The following ships of the Indian Navy have been named Sutlej:

, a  de-commissioned in 1978
, a  commissioned in 1993

Indian Navy ship names